Patrick Dhane Lanshaw (born October 6, 1982), better known by his stage name Lil Wyte, is an American rapper. He is a member of the rap collective Hypnotize Minds and owner of the independent label Wyte Music.

Early life 
Growing up in Frayser, Lil Wyte discovered his rapping talent at a young age as he could rap Sir Mix-a-Lot's entire song "Baby Got Back" completely. He participated in freestyle battles at high school when he was in ninth grade. Lanshaw rapped with his friend "Lil Black", who inspired him to use the pseudonym "Lil Wyte" and write songs instead of freestyling.

Lanshaw dropped out of high school, but eventually earned his high school diploma.

Music career 
Lil Wyte was part of a local rap group, the Shelby Forest Click.

The group's home-made demo tape came to the attention of Three 6 Mafia. Juicy J and DJ Paul (one song in particular is said to have gotten him signed, a song titled Memphiz Playaz). Three 6 Mafia signed the rapper and worked later with his debut album. Lil Wyte appeared on Project Pat's song "Crash da Club" from his album Layin' da Smack Down in 2002. His debut album Doubt Me Now was released in 2003 and it became popular, selling over 135,000 copies without promotion. The album Doubt Me Now featured Juvenile, Three 6 Mafia, Frayser Boy, La Chat and Josey Scott. The album had three popular songs: "Oxycotton", "My Smoking Song", and "Acid". 

He has been described as a rapid lyricist.

Personal life 
Lil Wyte passed up the opportunity of writing the song "It's Hard out Here for a Pimp", because he could not relate to the lyrics of having more than one woman.

Lil Wyte used three strains of marijuana to create his own strain of medical cannabis called OG WYTE Kush. It's available in 11 states. The three original strains are Og Kush, White Widow and Grand Daddy Purp.

In 2012 he was arrested in Clarksville, Tennessee for DUI and drug possession.

Discography
Studio albums

Mixtapes
2008: Cocaine & Kush
2009: Cocaine Kush 2 (Love, Hate, Betrayal)
2009: Wyte Christmas
2010: Wyte Christmas 2 (Let It SNO)
2011: Wyte Christmas 3
2012: Wyte Out
2012: Wyte Boyz Wasted (with Barzz & J.P)
2013: Wyte Out Pt. 2
2013: July 16 (with JellyRoll)
2013: Wyte Christmas 4
2014: Wyte Lytes (with DJ Hylyte)
2016: Wyte Christmas 6 (with DJ Ritz)
Date unknown: House full of guns

Singles

Guest appearances

References

External links 
 
 Talkin' Ain't Walkin' | Lil Wyte
 

1982 births
Living people
American crunk musicians
American male rappers
American music industry executives
Asylum Records artists
Businesspeople from Tennessee
Horrorcore artists
Rappers from Memphis, Tennessee
Southern hip hop musicians
Underground rappers
21st-century American rappers
21st-century American male musicians